Waywell is a surname. Notable people with the surname include:

Christopher J Waywell (born 1961) University of Oxford Graduate, Local Historian and Genealogist. 
Geoffrey B. Waywell (1944–2016), British archaeologist and classical scholar
Mike Waywell (born 1988), English rugby union player
Reginald Waywell (1924-2018) Northern Artist (Warrington based) Doctor of Fine Art